Musa Murtazaliev (born 26 May 1988) is an Armenian Freestyle wrestler of Avar descent. Although he is from Dagestan, Musa feels comfortable representing Armenia.

Murtazaliev won a silver medal at the 2011 European Wrestling Championships. He won another silver medal at the 2013 European Wrestling Championships. Murtazaliev had moved up in weight from 74 kg to 84 kg. Murtazaliev won a bronze medal at the 2014 European Wrestling Championships.

He is married.

References

1988 births
Living people
People from Terek Oblast
Avar people
Armenian male sport wrestlers
Wrestlers at the 2015 European Games
European Games competitors for Armenia
Armenian people of Dagestani descent
European Wrestling Championships medalists